The 1997 local elections in Zagreb were held on 13 April 1997 for members of the Zagreb Assembly. The Croatian Democratic Union (HDZ) won a majority in the City Assembly with 24 seats out of 50. Marina Matulović-Dropulić was named the new Mayor of Zagreb.

Results

Assembly election

The Croatian Democratic Union (HDZ) won 34.92% of the votes or 154,960 and gained 24 out of 50 seats in the Zagreb City Assembly. The Social Democratic Party of Croatia (SDP) came second with 106,072 or 23.91% of the votes and 14 seats, while the Croatian Social Liberal Party (HSLS) came third with 46,920 votes or 10.57% and gained 9 seats. After Croatian Peasant Party (HSS) members of the Assembly joined HDZ, Marina Matulović Dropulić was named the new Mayor of Zagreb.

References

See also
List of mayors of Zagreb

Zagreb 1997
Elections in Zagreb
Zagreb
1990s in Zagreb